Ede Vadászi (September 13, 1923 in Budapest – June 12, 1995 in Budapest), aka Ede Viboch, was a Hungarian basketball player who competed in the 1948 Summer Olympics.

He was a member of the Hungarian team, which finished sixteenth in the 1948 tournament.

References

1923 births
1995 deaths
Hungarian men's basketball players
Olympic basketball players of Hungary
Basketball players at the 1948 Summer Olympics
Basketball players from Budapest